Van Dijck is a crater on Mercury, located near the north pole.  Its name was adopted by the International Astronomical Union (IAU) in 1979. Van Dijck is named for Flemish painter Anthony van Dyck.

References

Impact craters on Mercury